
Year 47 BC was a year of the pre-Julian Roman calendar. At the time, it was known as the Year of the Consulship of Calenius and Vatinius (or, less frequently, year 707 Ab urbe condita). The denomination 47 BC for this year has been used since the early medieval period, when the Anno Domini calendar era became the prevalent method in Europe for naming years....

Events 
 By place 

 Roman Republic 
 Consuls: Quintus Fufius Calenus, Publius Vatinius.
 Civil War:
 August – Julius Caesar quells a mutiny of his veterans in Rome.
 October – Caesar's invasion of Africa, against Metellus Scipio and Labienus, Caesar's former lieutenant in Gaul.

 Egypt 
 January 13 – Queen Cleopatra VII promotes her younger brother Ptolemy XIV of Egypt to co-ruler.
 February – Caesar and his ally Cleopatra VII of Egypt defeat the forces of the rival Egyptian Queen Arsinoe IV in the Battle of the Nile. Ptolemy is killed; Caesar, with the aid of Mithridates I of the Bosporus, then relieves his besieged forces in Alexandria.

 Anatolia 
 August 2 – Caesar defeats Pharnaces II of Pontus, king of the Bosphorus, in the Battle of Zela (the war Caesar tersely describes as veni, vidi, vici).

 Judea 
 Battle at Mount Tabor in Judea: Roman troops, commanded by Gabinius, defeat the forces of Alexander, son of Aristobulus II of Judea, who is attempting to re-establish Judean independence. Some 10,000 Jews die at the hands of the Romans.

 China 
 Feng Yuan becomes consort to Emperor Yuan of the Han Dynasty.

Births 
 June 23 – Caesarion, prince of Egypt, later Ptolemy XV (d. 30 BC)
 Marcus Antonius Antyllus, son of Mark Antony and Fulvia (d. 30 BC)

Deaths 
 Pharnaces II of Pontus, king of the Bosporan Kingdom (b. c. 97 BC)
 Ptolemy XIII Theos Philopator, king of Egypt (drowned in the Nile)
 Alexander, Hasmonean prince (executed)

References